Oh No Doctor! is a 1934 British comedy film directed by George King and starring Jack Hobbs, Dorothy Boyd and James Finlayson. It was made as a quota quickie for distribution by the American company MGM.

Cast
 Jack Hobbs as Montagu Kent  
 Dorothy Boyd as Josephine Morrow  
 James Finlayson as Axminster  
 Cecil Humphreys as Dr. Morrow  
 Peggy Novak as Tessa Burnett  
 Jane Carr as Protheroe  
 Abraham Sofaer as Skelton  
 David Wilton as Villain

References

Bibliography
 Low, Rachael. Filmmaking in 1930s Britain. George Allen & Unwin, 1985.
 Wood, Linda. British Films, 1927-1939. British Film Institute, 1986.

External links

1934 films
British comedy films
1934 comedy films
Films directed by George King
Quota quickies
British black-and-white films
1930s English-language films
1930s British films